is a private women's junior college in Fukui, Fukui, Japan, established in 1965.

External links
 Official website 

Japanese junior colleges
Educational institutions established in 1965
Private universities and colleges in Japan
Universities and colleges in Fukui Prefecture
Women's universities and colleges in Japan
Fukui (city)
1965 establishments in Japan